Lime Creek Township is a township in Washington County, Iowa, USA.

History
Lime Creek Township was organized in 1845.

References

Townships in Washington County, Iowa
Townships in Iowa
1845 establishments in Iowa Territory